Southern West Virginia is a culturally and geographically distinct region in the U.S. state of West Virginia. Southern West Virginia is known for its coal mining heritage and Southern affinity. The region is also closely identified with southwestern Virginia and southeastern Kentucky, with close proximity to western North Carolina and East Tennessee. Today, Southern West Virginia continues to grapple with poverty and continuing population loss. Almost the entire region is located in West Virginia's 3rd congressional district, which is represented by Carol Miller.

Southern West Virginia, in a cultural and historical context, includes Boone County, Fayette County, Greenbrier County, Lincoln County, Logan County, McDowell County, Mercer County, Mingo County, Monroe County, Nicholas County, Raleigh County, Summers County, and Wyoming County. 

The City of Beckley, in Raleigh County, is the largest city in this region, followed by Bluefield, in Mercer County.  Beckley has undergone a period of modest economic growth, and serves as the primary economic and cultural hub of much of Southern West Virginia.

Attractions
Places of interest and potential attractions include New River Gorge, New River Gorge Bridge, Tamarack, Best of West Virginia, and The Greenbrier. 

Winterplace Ski Resort and Summersville Lake are both recreation options also present here.

Southern West Virginia is also home for numerous renowned sports teams, including the Bluefield Blue Jays, the Princeton Rays, and the West Virginia Miners.

Educational institutions

Colleges and Universities

Universities and colleges
Southern West Virginia has a large array of universities and colleges, including Appalachian Bible College, Bluefield State College, Bridgemont Community and Technical College, Concord University, University of Charleston–Beckley, New River Community and Technical College, Southern West Virginia Community and Technical College, West Virginia School of Osteopathic Medicine, and West Virginia University Institute of Technology.

Public high schools
The state's public high schools are Bluefield High School, Chapmanville Regional High School, Fayetteville High School (West Virginia), Greenbrier East High School, Greenbrier West High School, Independence High School (West Virginia), James Monroe High School (West Virginia), Lincoln County High School (West Virginia), Liberty High School (Glen Daniel, West Virginia), Logan High School (West Virginia), Man High School, Meadow Bridge High School, Midland Trail High School, Mingo Central Comprehensive High School, Montcalm High School, Mount View High School (West Virginia), Nicholas County High School, Oak Hill High School (West Virginia), PikeView High School, Princeton High School, Richwood High School (West Virginia), River View High School (West Virginia), Scott High School (Madison, West Virginia), Shady Spring High School, Sherman High School (Seth, West Virginia), Summers County High School, Tug Valley High School, Valley High School (Smithers, West Virginia), Van Junior-Senior High School, Westside High School (West Virginia), Woodrow Wilson High School (Beckley, West Virginia), and Wyoming East High School.

Private secondary schools
Southern West Virginia's private secondary schools are Beth Haven Christian School, Bluefield International Academy, Greater Beckley Christian School, Mercer Christian Academy, Mountain View Christian School, Regional Christian School, Rainelle Christian Academy, Seneca Trail Christian Academy, Trinity Christian Academy, and Victory Baptist Academy.

Historical events and landmarks
The main historical events and landmarks located in Southern West Virginia are the Hatfield–McCoy feud, John Henry (folklore), and The West Virginia Mine Wars.

Media

TV
TV networks based in Southern West Virginia include the WVVA - Bluefield - NBC - 6, the WOAY - Oak Hill - ABC - 4, the WVNS - Ghent - CBS - 59, and the WLFB - Bluefield - Religious - 40.

Radio
Radio stations based in Southern West Virginia include WCIR-FM - Beckley - Top 40 - 103.7 FM, WTNJ-FM - Mt. Hope - Country - 105.9 FM, WHAJ-FM - Bluefield - Hot AC - 104.5 FM, WVOW-FM - Logan - Variety - 101.9 FM, WJLS-FM - Beckley - Country - 99.5 FM, WXCC-FM - Williamson - Country - 96.5 FM, WAXS-FM - Oak Hill - Oldies - 94.1 FM, and WRON-FM - Ronceverte - Good Time Oldies - 97.7 FM.

Population

See also
Southwest Virginia

External links 
Southern West Virginia Convention & Visitors Bureau

Regions of West Virginia
Geography of Appalachia
Geography of West Virginia